Bradley Moran (born 29 September 1986 in England) is a former Australian rules footballer in the Australian Football League. Since 2011, when he retired as an AFL player, Moran has worked in business, founding two startup technology companies, NoQ in 2011 and CitrusAd in 2017.  CitrusAd was acquired in July 2021 by French company Publicis for a reported $205 million.

Early life
Born in Solihull in the West Midlands of England to English parents, his father Martyn was a former junior soccer player.  Moran grew up in Stratford-upon-Avon with dreams of becoming a soccer player.

As a youth, he represented West Midlands county in rugby union.  He was also a representative soccer player.

Moran moved to Australia with his family as a 15-year-old, looking to pursue a career in rugby. 
One of his school friends encouraged him to try Aussie Rules with the Surfers Paradise AFC juniors, where he was mentored by former Brisbane Bears captain Roger Merrett.  He took to the game quickly and developed a passion for it.  His high school, The Southport School had a policy against Australian Football being part of its curriculum, so he had to remain playing club football and instead also played rowing and basketball at school.

Moran quickly showed ability and talent in the ruck.  He broke his wrist leading up to the Under 18 national championships, which set back his recruitment.  However, after playing football with the Southport Sharks, at age 18 he was recruited to the elite level by the Kangaroos Football Club in the 2004 AFL draft.

AFL career
Wearing the number 18 guernsey, previously worn by Wayne Carey, Moran made his debut in 2006 against Hawthorn at Aurora Stadium. He played an effective game in one of the Roos' worst performances of the season. He collected 21 disposals, 10 marks and 10 hitouts, which earned a nomination for the AFL Rising Star Award. He continued his good form into the following week against Collingwood, where the Roos were comprehensively beaten in the second half.

Moran was traded to the Adelaide Football Club at the end of the 2007 Premiership season. He took up the number 2 guernsey, which was also previously worn by Carey during his brief stint at the Crows. After injuries ruined the first half of his 2008 season, he played his first game for the Crows in round 16 and impressed as a tall defender and ruckman, thereafter becoming a fixture in the lineup. When moved into the forward line against Carlton in round 18 to cover the loss of Jason Porplyzia, Moran booted four goals for the game to help the Crows to an eight-point victory, thus adding another string to his bow as a utility.

In 2009, Moran quickly became a regular in the Adelaide side, forming a ruck combination with Ivan Maric. However, midway through the season he injured his knee, which would keep him out for the remainder of the season.

Moran announced his retirement on 31 August 2011 after ongoing injuries.

International qualification
Moran was eligible to represent Great Britain at the 2008 Australian Football International Cup as the criteria at the time would have allowed him to compete as a part of the British team since he was born in England and moved to Australia as a teenager. However, Great Britain's national team deliberately overlooked Moran because he did not learn the game in England. Moran continues to be a strong advocate for the sport as an ambassador for Australia international rules football team, appearing in an England Dragonslayers guernsey for its junior league promotions.

Post-AFL career running startup technology businesses
In 2011, after his retirement from the Adelaide Crows, Moran jumped into a new field by launching a startup technology business called NoQ (pronounced no queue), which offered a smartphone application that allowed the user to dodge the queue by pre-ordering food and drinks such as coffee. During the next five years, Moran successfully raised capital for NoQ (now egrowcery.com) from investors including Bendigo & Adelaide Bank and secured clients such as Westfield Group and Noodle Box. He left the business in 2016 to move in to the customer experience sector.

Transactions became transformational in March 2017, when Moran and former NoQ colleague Nick Paech launched an advertising technology start-up called CitrusAd, based in Brisbane. By placing AI technology at the core of retailing strategy, Moran knew retailers could leverage their data in real time to improve sales and open a new line of revenue by allowing brands to easily and more effectively use the data for highly targeted ads at the point-of-purchase. With the impending deprecation of third-party cookies, sources of first-party data became a larger focus for marketers to target effectively. Retailer first-party data became coveted as software platforms such as the one Moran offered through CitrusAd would cull massive amounts of shopper data to ensure that relevant offers were served on retailer websites and apps in a more personalized manner. Moran’s self-serve, simple to use, white label platform became a “plug and play” option for retailers to compete with higher tech retailers such as Amazon. This upended the status quo as suddenly business roles reversed with retailers selling to suppliers and CPG suppliers / brands moving into buying roles to purchase retail media being supplied by their retail business customers. Moran used built in algorithms to reduce the inefficiencies of serving ads for products that were either out-of-stock or not relevant to the shopper while taking into account margin, velocity and other metrics.

Brands saw an advantage over traditional advertising tactics by having access to retailer data via the AI used for matching shoppers to applicable brands resulting in better ROAS (return on ad spend) for brand advertisers. Moran’s team built a closed-loop analytics dashboard on the CitrusAd platform to measure ROI from ads served to sales transactions. The platform became a key component in the digital transformation of retailing by delivering personalization at scale to improve shopper experiences.

In August 2018, Moran shared that 14 AU retailers including Dan Murphy’s were already using the platform. By June if 2019, CitrusAd signed Coles Group, Ocado, Techdata, Woolworths and the company’s  first U.S.retailer, Hy-Vee.

In June 2020, MA Financial Group (part of Moelis & Company) announced investment of AU6.5 million, adding Moelis & Company to its list of growth-stage companies and funding CitrusAd’s international growth. Shortly thereafter, Moran announced CitrusAd had signed new international clients including Groupon in the U.S. and Sainsbury's in the UK.

In July 2021, French company Publicis Groupe announced it had acquired CitrusAd for an undisclosed amount. Moran continues to hold a senior executive role at CitrusAd under its new owner. In October 2021, the Australian Financial Review reported that Publicis had paid $205 million for CitrusAd.

In December 2021, Moran won the Digital Disruptor award in the 2021 Australian Young Entrepreneur Awards.

In a Forbes magazine article on February 28, 2022 Retail Media Networks Are One Of The Most Important Trends Of 2022, But They Need To Evolve, Moran is quoted as predicting that 2022 would see retailers and brands extend their long-standing knowledge of how in-store shelf placement affects sales to how online brand placement affects both online purchasing and in-store behavior.

Awards and recognitions
2019 Pearcey Queensland Entrepreneur Award Finalist.
Top 20 under 40 Young Business Stars.
Digital Disruptor award - 2020 & 2021 Australian Young Entrepreneur Awards.
Named as the 14th most successful young entrepreneur in Australia in 2021.
Named as one of the Top 100 Digital Entrepreneurs in Australia.

References

External links

2006 WFN story – Brad Moran stars on debut for North Melbourne

1986 births
Living people
Adelaide Football Club players
Australian people of English descent
Australian rules footballers from Queensland
English players of Australian rules football
English rugby union players
North Melbourne Football Club players
Rugby union players from Solihull
Southport Australian Football Club players
VFL/AFL players born in England
West Adelaide Football Club players